Dongli may refer to:

Dongli District (东丽区), Tianjin, China
Tianjin Dongli (天津东丽), Chinese football club
Ma Zhiyuan (c. 1250–1321), courtesy name Dongli (東籬), Chinese poet
Towns (东里镇)
Dongli, Leizhou, in Leizhou City, Guangdong
Dongli, Shantou, in Chenghai District, Shantou, Guangdong
Dongli, Yiyuan County, in Yiyuan County, Shandong